Sir Robin Day (24 October 1923 – 6 August 2000) was an English political journalist and television and radio broadcaster.

Day's obituary in The Guardian by Dick Taverne stated that he was "the most outstanding television journalist of his generation. He transformed the television interview, changed the relationship between politicians and television, and strove to assert balance and rationality into the medium's treatment of current affairs".

Early life
Day was born in Hampstead Garden Suburb, London, the youngest of four children of William Day (c. 1885 - c. 1948) a Post Office telephone engineer who became a GPO administrative manager, and his wife Florence. He received his early formal education at Brentwood School from 1934 to 1938, briefly attended the Crypt School, Gloucester, and later Bembridge School on the Isle of Wight.

During World War II he received a commission into the British Army's Royal Artillery, with which he served from 1943.  He was deployed to East Africa  and saw little action. He was discharged from the British Army in 1947 with the rank of Lieutenant, and went up to St Edmund Hall, Oxford to read law. Whilst at Oxford University he was elected president of the Oxford Union debating society, and also took part in a debating tour of the United States of America, run by the English-Speaking Union.

He was called to the Bar at Middle Temple in 1952, but practised law only briefly.

Journalistic career
 
Day spent almost his entire working life in journalism. He rose to prominence on the new Independent Television News (ITN) from 1955. According to Dick Taverne, Day first came to notice by interviewing Sir Kenneth Clark, then chairman of the regulator Independent Television Authority. The ITA had proposed to cut ITN's broadcasting hours and finances. His direct, non-deferential approach was then entirely new. Day was the first British journalist to interview Egypt's President Nasser after the Suez Crisis.

In 1958, he interviewed Prime Minister Harold Macmillan, in what the Daily Express called: "the most vigorous cross-examination a prime minister has been subjected to in public". The interview turned Day into a television personality and was probably the first time that British television became a serious part of the political process. He was on the staff of ITN for four years, resigning to stand at the 1959 general election as a Liberal Party candidate for Hereford but was not elected. After a brief period at the News Chronicle, he moved to the BBC.

He was a regular fixture on all BBC general election night programmes from the 1960s until 1987. On television, he presented Panorama and chaired Question Time (1979–89). His incisive and sometimes – by the standards of the day – abrasive interviewing style, together with his heavy-rimmed spectacles and trademark bow tie, made him an instantly recognisable and frequently impersonated figure over five decades.

In the early 1970s, Day worked on BBC Radio, where he proved an innovator with It's Your Line (1970–76). This was a national phone-in programme that enabled ordinary people, for the first time, to put questions directly to the prime minister and other politicians (it later spawned Election Call). He also presented The World at One from 1979 to 1987. In the 1981 New Year Honours, he was knighted for his services to broadcasting.

He became known in British broadcasting as "the Grand Inquisitor" for his abrasive interviewing of politicians, a style out of keeping with the British media's habitual deference to authority in the early days of his career.

In October 1982, during a Newsnight interview with the Conservative Secretary of State for Defence John Nott, pursuing cuts in defence expenditure, in particular Royal Navy, Day posed the question: "Why should the public on this issue believe you, a transient, here today and, if I may say so, gone tomorrow politician rather than a senior officer of many years' experience?" Nott, who had announced he was to retire at the next general election, removed his own microphone and walked off the set. Nott's autobiography in 2003 was called Here Today Gone Tomorrow: Recollections of an Errant Politician.

After leaving Question Time, he moved to the new satellite service BSB where he presented the weekly political discussion programme Now Sir Robin. When BSB merged with Sky Television, the programme continued to be broadcast on Sky News for a while. On the night of the 1992 general election Day resumed his role as interviewer, this time on ITN's general election night coverage, broadcast on ITV.

During the mid-1990s he regularly contributed to the lunchtime Channel Four political programme Around the House and presented Central Lobby for Central, the ITV franchise in the Midlands. That show was sometimes broadcast at the same time as his old programme Question Time was being broadcast by the BBC.

For 25 years he campaigned tirelessly, and eventually successfully, for the televising of Parliament – not in the interests of television, but of Parliament itself. He claimed that he was the first to present the detailed arguments in favour, in a Hansard Society paper in 1963.

Monty Python's Flying Circus often referred to Day – for example in the 'Eddie Baby' sketch, in which John Cleese turns to the camera and states: "Robin Day's got a hedgehog called Frank". In another sketch, Eric Idle said he was able to return his "Robin Day tie" to Harrods. He was also spoofed (as "Robin Yad") on The Goodies' episode "Saturday Night Grease". Day appeared as himself on an installment of the Morecambe & Wise show, in which he berates Ernie Wise in character. Then Eric Morecambe, acting as a TV presenter, says, "Sadly, we've come to the end of today's 'Friendly Discussion with Robin Day'".

He was also frequently lampooned by the satirical TV programme Spitting Image. In this, he would frequently be shown interviewing then-prime minister Margaret Thatcher who would always give answers somewhat unrelated to the question. The breathing difficulties which affected him later in life were represented: "My name is Robin (deep breath) Day."

His last regular TV work was Robin Day's Book Talk which aired in the early days of BBC News 24 in around 1998. The programme featured interviews and discussions about books, broadly around a political theme. On occasions, it took the form of a one-on-one interview, while on other occasions it consisted of a panel discussion.

Autobiographies
Day's two autobiographies were entitled Day by Day (1975) and Grand Inquisitor (1989).

Death
Day died from heart complications, aged 76, on the evening of 6 August 2000 at the Wellington Hospital in London. 

A funeral service was held at the chapel of Mortlake Crematorium, where his body was cremated. His ashes were buried in a grave near the south door of the Church of St Candida and Holy Cross, at Whitchurch Canonicorum in the county of Dorset. The grave's memorial stone bears the words: "In loving memory of Sir Robin Day – The Grand Inquisitor".

Personal life
In 1965, Day married Katherine Ainslie, an Australian law don at St Anne's College, Oxford; the couple had two sons. The marriage was dissolved in 1986. His elder son suffered multiple skull fractures in a childhood fall, and never fully recovered.

In the 1980s, Day had a coronary bypass, and he suffered from breathing problems that were often evident when he was on the air. He had always fought against a tendency to put on weight.

The broadcaster Joan Bakewell recalled that while Day was professional when in the office, he was disrespectful towards female newsreaders: "Socially he was a menace. There was no subtlety in his manner: at office parties he would attack head on. 'Do the men you interview fancy you? Do they stare at your legs? Do they stare at your breasts? Do you sleep with many of them?' ... Whenever he loomed in sight, I made myself scarce".

Publications
 Television: A Personal Report (1961)
 Day by Day: A Dose of My Own Hemlock (1975) (autobiography)
 The Media and Political Violence, by Richard Clutterbuck (1983; Day wrote the foreword)
 The Grand Inquisitor (1989) (autobiography)
 ... But with Respect (1993) (interview transcripts)
 Speaking for Myself (1999) (collection of speeches)

In popular culture 
Day is portrayed by Bertie Carvel in the episode "Marionettes" in season 2 of the Netflix series The Crown.

References

External links
 
 Sir Robin Day: 1923–2000 from the BBC
 Tributes from the BBC

1923 births
2000 deaths
20th-century British journalists
20th-century English memoirists
Alumni of St Edmund Hall, Oxford
British Army personnel of World War II
ITN newsreaders and journalists
BBC newsreaders and journalists
British reporters and correspondents
English television presenters
Knights Bachelor
Liberal Party (UK) parliamentary candidates
Panorama (British TV programme)
Presidents of the Oxford Union
People educated at The Crypt School, Gloucester
People educated at Brentwood School, Essex
People educated at Bembridge School
Royal Artillery officers
English autobiographers